Jonathan Russell (1771–1832) was a U.S. Representative from Massachusetts.

Jonathan Russell may also refer to:

 Jonathan Russell (composer) (born 1979), American composer and clarinetist
 Jonathan "Jazz" Russell (born 1995), American jazz violinist
 Jon Russell (One Life to Live), fictional character in the soap opera
 Jon Russell, a candidate in the United States House of Representatives elections in Washington, 2010
 Jon Russell (footballer) (born 2000), English footballer

See also
 John Russell (disambiguation)